Alonso Guzmán y Talavera, O.S.H. was a Roman Catholic prelate who was appointed the first Bishop of Trujillo (1577).

Biography
Alonso Guzmán y Talavera was ordained a priest in the Order of Saint Jerome.
In 1577, he was appointed during the papacy of Pope Gregory XIII as Bishop of Trujillo.
He was consecrated bishop but then immediately resigned from his posting for which the reason is not known.

References

External links and additional sources
 (for Chronology of Bishops) 
 (for Chronology of Bishops) 

16th-century Roman Catholic bishops in Peru
Bishops appointed by Pope Gregory XIII
Hieronymite bishops
Roman Catholic bishops of Trujillo